Glyphipterix beta is a species of sedge moth in the genus Glyphipterix. It is found in Japan and on the Kuril Islands.

The wingspan is 12–16 mm.

References

Moths described in 1964
Glyphipterigidae
Moths of Japan